Valentina Efimovna Kuindzhi (born 24 August 1884 – 6 June 1969) was a Russian and Soviet stage and film actress.

Selected filmography 
 1924 — Aelita
 1947 — Miklukho-Maklai
 1958 — October Days

References

External links 
 ВАЛЕНТИНА КУИНДЖИ on kino-teatr.ru

19th-century births
1969 deaths
Russian stage actresses
Russian film actresses
Russian silent film actresses
Soviet film actresses
Soviet stage actresses
20th-century Russian actresses
Actresses from Saint Petersburg